Aleksander Walmann Åsgården (born 12 January 1986), known professionally as simply Aleksander Walmann, is a Norwegian singer and songwriter. He represented Norway in the Eurovision Song Contest 2017 with the song "Grab the Moment", along with music producer JOWST finishing in 10th place.

Early life and career 
Walmann was born in Porsgrunn, and grew up in a musical family through childhood. From the age of 13 and until he started playing music, Aleksander was an active snowboarder at an international level. In 2012, he participated in season one of The Voice – Norges beste stemme, Norway's version of The Voice, where he had Sondre Lerche as his mentor. He went on a shared second place together with Hege Øversveen and Leif Anders Wentzel in the competitions finale, only beaten by winner Martin Halla.

Walmann and Norwegian music producer JOWST were confirmed to be taking part in Melodi Grand Prix 2017, Norway's national selection for the Eurovision Song Contest 2017, on 7 February 2017. In the final, held on 11 March, JOWST and Walmann received the maximum 12 points from four of the eleven international juries in addition to winning the televote. They subsequently advanced to the gold final, where they won the competition. They represented Norway in the Eurovision Song Contest 2017, and competed in the second half of the second semi-final for a place in the final. They succeeded and on 13 May 2017 they received the 10th place in the competition.

On 7 June 2017, NRK announced that Walmann would compete in the sixth season of the Norwegian music TV-competition .

He competed in Melodi Grand Prix 2018 and attempt to represent Norway in the Eurovision Song Contest 2018 for the second time in a row with the song 'Talk to the Hand', in which he was eliminated in the Silver Final.

Philanthropy 
On the night of 23 July 2011, Aleksander wrote his very first song called "Don't Let Go (In This Together)", about the 2011 Norway attacks. "It only took a couple of hours before the song was finished, and was written to process the strong impressions after the events." As of Åsgården's support to the victims, he was among the artists who attended the memorial concert.

One year later on 22 July 2012, Åsgården donated the revenues from his song "Don't Let Go" to the Norwegian Red Cross and Utøyastiftelsen (Utøya Foundation). "It means much to be able to give something. [And] I hope more people will hear the song and help to support. The more I get the better.", he said.

Discography

Singles

As lead artist

As featured artist

Production credits

Filmography

Dubbing

References

External links 

Official Eurovision representation

Living people
1986 births
Musicians from Porsgrunn
Eurovision Song Contest entrants for Norway
Eurovision Song Contest entrants of 2017
The Voice (franchise) contestants
Norwegian pop singers
Norwegian dance musicians
Norwegian male voice actors
21st-century Norwegian singers
21st-century Norwegian male singers